St Helen's Rugby and Cricket Ground, commonly known simply as St Helens Ground, is a sports venue in Swansea, Wales, owned and operated by the City and County of Swansea Council. Used mainly for rugby union and cricket, it has been the home ground of Swansea RFC and Swansea Cricket Club since it opened in 1873.

In rugby union, St Helen's was the venue for the first ever home match of the Wales national team in 1882. It continued to be used regularly by Wales, often for the Five Nations Championship, until 1954, but has staged only one full international since, in 1997. More recently, the ground has been used by the Wales women's team.

Glamorgan County Cricket Club have regularly used St Helen's as an outground since 1921. The ground has staged two One Day Internationals: England against New Zealand in 1973, and a 1983 World Cup match between Pakistan and Sri Lanka. St. Helen's was the location of Sir Garfield Sobers's six sixes in a single over in first-class cricket, the maximum possible runs in a single over, and the first time it had been done.

St Helen's has also staged international matches in two other sports. In rugby league, Wales played thirteen matches at the ground between 1945 and 1978, two of which were part of the 1975 World Cup tournament. A football international between Wales and Ireland took place at St Helen's in 1894.

History
Since the ground opened in 1873 it has been the home of the Swansea Rugby Football Club, and the Swansea Cricket Club.

On 19 June 1928 the ground was the venue of a mile race, for Swansea Grammar School's Sports Day, won by a teenage Dylan Thomas; he carried a newspaper photograph of his victory with him until his death.

In 2005, the venue could hold an audience of 10,500 seated before it was re-developed. The famous east stand, which had provided cloisters over part of Oystermouth Road, has since been demolished and replaced with a metallic stand unloved by locals. The tallest flood light stand in Europe is in St. Helen's Ground. In late November 2007, the ground's perimeter wall in the South East corner, next to Mumbles Road and Gorse Lane, was knocked down and a new wall built further inside the ground, in similar style to the old wall. This was to accommodate a new car park with 39 spaces for the Patti Pavilion.

Rugby
The first home international in the history of Welsh rugby was played at St Helen's on 16 December 1882, against England. The ground was the scene of New Zealand's first victory over Wales in 1924. On 10 April 1954, St. Helen's staged its last international until a Test match between Wales and Tonga was also played at the ground in 1997. The decision to abandon Swansea as an international rugby union venue in the 1950s was prompted by overstretch of what was then a 50,000-capacity ground; delays for players and spectators travelling west along the A48, especially at Port Talbot; and higher revenues from games at Cardiff Arms Park. Swansea Corporation discussed raising the capacity to 70,000 or even 82,000, but wartime bomb damage inflicted on the city forced a revision of building priorities. However, the ground has been used to host three Welsh women's internationals. The first women's international at Swansea was in April 1999 against England, and the most recent was in November 2009 when Wales defeated Sweden 56–7.

Swansea RFC defeated New Zealand 11–3 at St Helen's on 28 September 1935, becoming the first club side to beat the All Blacks. Swansea also defeated world champions Australia 21–6 in November 1992, when Australia played their first match of their Welsh Tour.

Between 1919 and 1952, St Helen's was also the home of Swansea Uplands RFC until the club sought its new home in Upper Killay.

During the 1975 Rugby League World Cup, Australia defeated Wales 18–6 in front of 11,112 fans (this match was broadcast throughout the United Kingdom by the BBC). The two sides again played at Swansea as part of the 1978 Kangaroo tour with the Kangaroos winning 8-3 before a crowd of 4,250.

Rugby league internationals
List of international rugby league matches played at St Helen's.

Football
List of Wales International football matches played at St Helen's.

Cricket

It was in this ground in 1968 that Garfield Sobers hit the first six sixes in one over in first-class cricket. Sobers was playing as captain of Nottinghamshire against Glamorgan.

As part of their commitment to the entire country of Wales, Glamorgan County Cricket Club play some of their home matches at St Helen's, as well as their regular home ground, SWALEC Stadium in Cardiff, and Penrhyn Avenue in Rhos-on-Sea.

Wales Minor Counties Cricket Club, who have played minor counties cricket since 1988, use the ground as a home base. They are currently the only non-English team in the Minor Counties Championship.

International centuries
A single ODI century has been scored at the venue.

References

External links
cricinfo: St Helen's
Glamorgan Cricket Club: St Helen's
Cricket Archive: St Helen's 

Swansea Bay
Sports venues in Swansea
Rugby union stadiums in Wales
Ospreys (rugby union)
Cricket grounds in Glamorgan
Stadiums in Swansea
Swansea RFC
Glamorgan County Cricket Club
Sports venues completed in 1873
1983 Cricket World Cup stadiums